Jo Hyun-joo (born December 13, 1992) is a South Korean artistic gymnast. She has represented her country at the 2008 Beijing Olympics as well as various World Championships throughout 2007 to 2010.

At the 2008 Olympic Games, she fell on the uneven bars and balance beam during the Qualification round.  At the 2010 World Gymnastics Championships in Rotterdam, Netherlands, Jo became the first female gymnast from the Republic of Korea to qualify to an event final.  She finished 6th on vault there.

References

External links
 
 
 

Gymnasts at the 2008 Summer Olympics
South Korean female artistic gymnasts
Living people
1992 births
Olympic gymnasts of South Korea
Sportspeople from Ulsan
Asian Games medalists in gymnastics
Gymnasts at the 2010 Asian Games
Asian Games bronze medalists for South Korea
Medalists at the 2010 Asian Games
Universiade medalists in gymnastics
Universiade gold medalists for South Korea
21st-century South Korean women